Harvey Mudd may refer to:

 Harvey Seeley Mudd (1888–1955), a mining engineer and businessman
 Harvey Mudd College, college named after Harvey Seeley Mudd